WYYC (1250 AM) is a religious radio station in York, Pennsylvania, and is owned by Steel City Radio, Inc.

References

External links

YYC
Radio stations established in 1983